Oh Yes I Can is the second solo studio album by Crosby, Stills, Nash & Young member David Crosby. It was released on January 23, 1989, 18 years on from his previous solo release, If I Could Only Remember My Name.

Four songs ("Drive My Car", "Distances", "Melody" and "Flying Man") had been slated to appear on Crosby's unfinished 1979-1981 Capitol Records solo album and were subsequently rejected for inclusion in Crosby, Stills & Nash projects. The group had attempted to record "Drive My Car" and "Distances" during aborted 1978 sessions for a follow-up to CSN (1977). One of the recordings from this time, "Drive My Car," was included in Crosby, Stills & Nash's 1991 box set, "CSN".

Track listing

Personnel 

 David Crosby – lead and backing vocals, guitars (5, 6), acoustic guitar (8)
 Danny Kortchmar – guitars (1, 3), electric guitar (8)
 David Lindley – slide guitar (1)
 Steve Lukather – guitars (2, 4)
 Michael Hedges – guitars (5, 11), additional backing vocals (5), arrangements (11)
 Dan Dugmore – slide guitar (6)
 Michael Landau – guitars (7)
 Larry Carlton – guitars (9)
 Craig Doerge – synthesizers (1), Yamaha TX816 Rhodes (2), acoustic piano (3, 4, 6, 10), Rhodes (4), keyboards (7, 9)
 Kim Bullard – synthesizers (2, 4, 10)
 Mike Finnigan – additional organ (3), organ (6)
 Kenny Kirkland – electric piano (8)
 Leland Sklar – bass (1, 2, 4, 7, 9-11)
 George "Chocolate" Perry – bass (3, 8)
 Tim Drummond – bass (6)
 Joe Vitale – drums (1, 3, 8), organ (3), synthesizers (10)
 Russ Kunkel – drums (2, 4, 7, 9, 10), percussion (7)
 Jim Keltner – drums (6)
 Joe Lala – percussion (2, 8, 9)
 Kim Hutchcroft – saxophones (3)
 Larry Williams – saxophones (3)
 Gary Grant – trumpet (3)
 Jerry Hey – trumpet (3), horn arrangements (3)
 Jackson Browne – additional backing vocals (4)
 Graham Nash – additional backing vocals (5, 11), electric piano (8)
 Bonnie Raitt – additional backing vocals (7)
 James Taylor – additional backing vocals (10)
 J.D. Souther – additional backing vocals (11)

Production 
 Producers – David Crosby; Craig Doerge and Stanley Johnston (Tracks 1-7, 9-11); Howard Alpert and Ron Alpert (Track 8).
 Executive Producer – Eddie Wilner
 Engineers – Stephen Barncard, Steve Gursky, Stanley Johnston, Gerry Lentz and Jay Parti.
 Assistant Engineers – Tom Banghart, Gary Boatner, Michael Bosley, Troy Cruze, Larry Goodwin, Scott Gordon, Mark McKenna, Russell Schmidt, Allan Tucker, Bob Vogt and Paul Winger.
 Mixing – Niko Bolas (Track 1); Stanley Johnston (Tracks 2-11).
 Mastered by Bob Ludwig and Mike Reese at Masterdisk (New York, NY) and A&M Mastering Studios (Los Angeles, CA).
 Art Direction and Design – Caroline Balog and Gary Burden
 Photography – Henry Diltz (back cover), Jay Parti (front cover) and Aaron Rapoport (inner sleeve).

Charts
Album - Billboard (United States)

Singles - Billboard (United States)

References

1989 albums
A&M Records albums
David Crosby albums
Albums produced by David Crosby
Albums recorded at A&M Studios